Binibining Pilipinas 1994 was the 31st edition of Binibining Pilipinas. It took place at the Araneta Coliseum in Quezon City, Metro Manila, Philippines on October 31, 1993. This was the first time in the history of the competition that the pageant was held on the preceding year the pageant was named after, due to the upcoming Miss Universe Pageant that will be held in Manila in May 1994.
 
At the end of the event, Dindi Gallardo crowned Charlene Gonzales as Binibining Pilipinas Universe 1994, Ruffa Gutierrez crowned Caroline Subijano as Binibining Pilipinas World 1994, Sheela Mae Santarin crowned Alma Concepcion as Binibining Pilipinas International 1994, and Jenette Fernando crowned Sheila Marie Dizon as Binibining Pilipinas Tourism 1994. Abbygale Arenas was named First Runner-Up, while Eda Calonia was named Second Runner-Up.

Results
Color keys
  The contestant was a Semi-Finalist/Finalist in an International pageant.

Special Awards

Contestants
33 contestants competed for the four titles.

Notes

Post-pageant Notes
 Charlene Gonzales placed Top 6 in Miss Universe 1994 in Manila. She also won the Best National Costume Award. On the other hand, Caroline Subijano was one of the ten semifinalists in Miss World 1994, held in Sun City, South Africa. Alma Concepcion placed Top 15 in Miss International 1994 in Ise, Mie, Japan, where she also bagged the Miss Congeniality Award.
 Maria Sovietskaya Bacud would go on and become a semifinalist in Mutya ng Pilipinas 1994. She competed at Miss Intercontinental 1995 and Queen of Clubs International 1994 where she would place 1st Runner-up in both pageants. She eventually competed again at Binibining Pilipinas 1996 and was named 1st Runner-Up. Morena Cabrera also competed at Mutya ng Pilipinas, and was crowned as Mutya ng Pilipinas-Queen of the Year International 1995.
 Abbygale Arenas competed again at Binibining Pilipinas 1997, and was crowned Binibining Pilipinas-Universe 1997. Arenas did not place in Miss Universe 1997 in Miami, but was awarded as Miss Photogenic.

References 
 

 
1994 beauty pageants
Beauty pageants in the Philippines
1994